Anne Zagré (born 13 March 1990) is a Belgian sprint athlete. In 2009 she became European youth champion in the 100m hurdles.

She competed at the 2020 Summer Olympics.

Biography
Just like Élodie Ouédraogo, Zagré has her roots in Burkina Faso.

She won 3 junior titles during her youth career. She achieved her last title during the 2009 European Athletics Junior Championships in Novi Sad, at the 100m hurdles.

Since 2006, Zagré has also achieved two silver medals at national indoor championships: long jump (2007) and 60m hurdles (2009).

Competition record

1Disqualified in the semifinals

Notes

References

External links

 
 
 
 
 Profile at the website of Ligue Belge Francophone d’Athlétisme 

1990 births
Living people
Belgian people of Burkinabé descent
Sportspeople of Burkinabé descent
Belgian female hurdlers
Belgian female sprinters
Athletes (track and field) at the 2012 Summer Olympics
Athletes (track and field) at the 2016 Summer Olympics
Athletes (track and field) at the 2020 Summer Olympics
Olympic athletes of Belgium
World Athletics Championships athletes for Belgium
Belgian Athletics Championships winners
People from Bree, Belgium
Sportspeople from Limburg (Belgium)